The Wind is a 1959 Soviet drama film directed by Aleksandr Alov and Vladimir Naumov.

Plot 
The film takes place during the civil war in a small town located in the south of Russia, which was captured by the White Guards. The film tells about a group of guys who decide to participate in the first Congress of the Union of Workers and Peasants Youth, held in Moscow. They have a long and difficult road ahead...

Cast 
 Eduard Bredun as Fedor
 Tamara Loginova as Nastya
 Elza Lezhdey as Mari
 Aleksandr Demyanenko as Mitya
 Aleksey Krychenkov
 Ivan Aleksandrov
 Anatoliy Romashin
 N. Soloshchenko
 Viktoriya Radunskaya
 Yury Yakovlev as Leonid Zakrevskiy (as Yu. Yakovlev)

References

External links 
 

1959 films
1950s Russian-language films
Soviet drama films
1959 drama films